"My Baby Thinks He's a Train" is a song written by Leroy Preston, and recorded by American country music artist Rosanne Cash.  It was released in August 1981 as the second single from the album Seven Year Ache.  The song was Cash's second number one on the country chart.  The single stayed at number one for a single week and spent a total of 11 weeks on the country chart.

Charts

References

1981 singles
1981 songs
Rosanne Cash songs
Columbia Records singles
Song recordings produced by Rodney Crowell